The 2013–14 season was Reading Football Club's first season back in the Championship following the side's relegation from the Premier League at the end of the 2012–13 season. It was also Nigel Adkins' only full season in charge of the club having succeeded Brian McDermott in March 2013.

The campaign began with a home win over Ipswich Town and after ten games the team had lost only once and were in the play-off places. Six defeats in 13 games between October and the new year saw Reading slip to 9th, though their form improved in January with three wins from five, including 7–1 and 5–1 victories over Bolton Wanderers and Blackpool respectively. Despite mixed form from February onwards, Reading remained in contention for the play-offs until the last game of the season. Needing only to equal Brighton & Hove Albion's result to finish in the top six, the team drew at home to already promoted Burnley whilst Brighton scored a last-minute winner at Nottingham Forest. Reading therefore finished seventh and were consigned to the Championship for another season. In the two domestic cup competitions, Reading were knocked out at the stage they entered. They were beaten 6–0 by Peterborough United in the second round of the League Cup, their heaviest defeat since 1999, whilst in the FA Cup third round they lost 1–0 to Brighton.

In his first season as a regular for the senior team Jordan Obita was named as the club's Player of the Season, beating Chris Gunter and Danny Williams into second and third respectively. With 15 goals, Adam Le Fondre was the team's top scorer for the third consecutive season. Somewhat overshadowing the season was the continuing uncertainty over the ownership of the club. The original deadline for the full takeover by Anton Zingarevich passed in September and by February, chairman Sir John Madejski confirmed that Zingarevich was no longer involved and that he was seeking new owners.

Season review 
Reading began planning for the 2013–14 Championship season on 28 April 2013, after a 0–0 draw at home to Queens Park Rangers condemned both sides to relegation from the Premier League.

Pre-season 
On 24 May, Reading announced that ten players would be leaving upon the expiry of their contracts. Those departing included Noel Hunt, Nicky Shorey, Ian Harte, Jay Tabb and Simon Church, as well as Joseph Mills, Brett Williams and three youngsters. Nicholas Bignall, who had been out injured since his loan deal with Wycombe Wanderers in 2011, was also released by the club having been named on the Premier League's released player list. Bignall however remained with the club on a non-contract basis whilst recovering from his injury.

Having been unable to agree a new contract over the course of the season, Alex Pearce eventually agreed a new two-year deal in June. Hal Robson-Kanu also agreed a new three-year contract, ending speculation linking him with a move to the Premier League. Goalkeepers Stuart Taylor and Jonathan Henly signed a new one and two-year contracts respectively, while four other out-of-contract players, including Lawson D'Ath also committed their futures to the club. Seven Academy graduates signed professional contracts and were given squad numbers for the first time, including Jake Cooper who was given a three-year deal. They were joined in the senior squad by Craig Tanner and Aaron Tshibola who signed professionally as youngsters in 2011.

In June Reading announced that they had agreed a partnership with Formula One team Marussia. The agreement sees Reading's logo displayed on Marussia's cars, and the Marussia logo on the reverse of Reading's shirts.

Transfers 

Reading signed three players prior to the start of the season, with all three arriving in July. Wayne Bridge was the first to sign, joining on a one-year deal following the expiry of his contract at Manchester City. Dutch International Royston Drenthe penned a two-year contract, with the option of a third, moving from Russian side Alania Vladikavkaz whilst Danny Williams joined from Hoffenheim for an undisclosed fee on a four-year contract. Former Brighton & Hove Albion manager Dean Wilkins also arrived as first-team coach.

Several players left the club on loan. In June Mikkel Andersen and Nick Arnold joined Danish Superliga side Randers and Wycombe Wanderers respectively on season-long deals. The following month Ryan Edwards moved on a season-long loan to Perth Glory with Daniel Carriço joining Sevilla on a similar deal with a view to a permanent transfer. Aberdeen signed Michael Hector for six months while Karl Sheppard's loan at Shamrock Rovers was extended until the end of the Irish season.

Friendlies 
Reading began pre-season on 13 July with a behind closed doors game against Wycombe Wanderers, winning 3–1. Adam Le Fondre, Pavel Pogrebnyak and Danny Williams, on debut, scored the goals. Two days later a 27-man squad then travelled to Portugal to play two matches. They drew the first, against Belenenses, 1–1 thanks to a late Le Fondre goal and won the second, against Olhanense, 5–1. Upon their return Reading faced Bristol City and suffered their first defeat, losing 1–0 after conceding a late goal. A heavy 3–0 defeat by Swansea City followed, before a 2–1 loss to Bristol Rovers, a long range Garath McCleary strike Reading's only goal.

The under-21 squad, playing as a "Reading XI", started their pre-season on the same day as the senior team and won 1–0 away to Basingstoke Town through a Shepherd Murombedzi goal. Three days later they comfortably beat Dartford 4–0 thanks to goals from Gozie Ugwu, Aaron Tshibola and a double from Craig Tanner. Another goal from Ugwu, one from Tarique Fosu-Henry and an own goal helped the youngsters earn a 3–3 draw against newly promoted League Two side Newport County. They played further games away to Boreham Wood, which they drew 1–1 courtesy of a De'Juane Taylor-Crossdale penalty, and Fulham, which finished 3–3, before a 3–2 win over Bristol City with Jake Taylor among the scorers.

August 
Reading started their season on 3 August at home to Ipswich Town. They went behind when former player Jay Tabb scored in the 16th minute, but equalised shortly before half time through Adam Le Fondre. Danny Guthrie then struck with a 25-yard, deflected shot to secure the victory. A week later the team travelled to Bolton Wanderers and drew 1–1 with Nick Blackman scoring his first goal for the club. The team then returned to the Madejski Stadium for a home game against Watford which Reading lead 2–0 at half time after goals from Le Fondre and Jem Karacan. A second Karacan goal had made it 3–1 before the visitors hit back with a penalty and a 90th-minute equaliser with the game ending 3–3. Goalkeeper Daniel Lincoln moved to Metropolitan Police on a one-month loan midway through the month. Reading confirmed that Werder Bremen striker Joseph Akpala was trialling at the club though ultimately he was not offered a contract. Young Glenavon striker Robbie McDaid also spent a week training with the Academy.

Reading suffered their first defeat of the season away to Blackpool, losing 1–0 after a late Tom Barkhuizen strike. Another away match followed with the side travelling to League One side Peterborough United for the second round of the League Cup. Peterborough took an early lead through Britt Assombalonga and added another two before half time. Three more goals in the second half, including two Lee Tomlin penalties which completed his hat-trick, consigned Reading to a comprehensive 6–0 loss, their heaviest defeat for 14 years. Reading faced Yeovil Town in the last game of the month and won 1–0 in the first ever league meeting between the two sides thanks to a second half Le Fondre penalty. Following the game it was confirmed that Jimmy Kébé had joined Crystal Palace for an undisclosed fee.

September 

On transfer deadline day Adrian Mariappa was the only player to leave the club, following Kébé to Crystal Palace. The first game of the month was a friendly against Oman which Reading lost 2–0. They resumed competitive action on 15 September against Brighton & Hove Albion in a televised game that ended 0–0. The first half saw Pavel Pogrebnyak sent off for two bookings while Brighton's Leonardo Ulloa also departed after receiving a straight red card. Reading then faced Leeds United who were under the management of former boss Brian McDermott and, after losing Jem Karacan early on to a serious knee injury, Adam Le Fondre headed home in the 96th minute to steal a 1–0 win.

On 20 September, Reading signed Northern Ireland international defender Chris Baird on a free transfer following his release from Fulham. Matt Partridge joined Basingstoke Town on a one-month loan while Daniel Lincoln was on the move again, joining Harrow Borough on a similar deal. Baird went straight into the team for the game against Derby County at Pride Park which Reading won 3–1. The returning Pavel Pogrebnyak opened the scoring with his first goal for the club since January before doubling their lead with his second of the game. Will Hughes pulled on back for Derby but Nick Blackman's injury time strike secured the win for Reading. Billy Sharp joined on an emergency loan from Southampton late in the month. He was an unused substitute for the game against Birmingham City which Reading won 2–0 through two Danny Guthrie free kicks. Guthrie was later nominated for Championship Player of the Month but lost out to Ipswich Town striker David McGoldrick.

October 
Reading began the month with a trip to Barnsley and drew 1–1 with Hal Robson-Kanu scoring his first goal of the season. Another away trip followed to Burnley where the side lost 2–1, Reading's reply coming from a Jason Shackell own goal. Reading returned from the international break with a home game against Doncaster Rovers which they won 4–1 with goals from Danny Guthrie, Adam Le Fondre, Garath McCleary and Pavel Pogrebnyak. The following week the team faced Millwall at home and took the lead through a Sean Morrison header in the ninth minute. Jimmy Abdou was sent off midway through the second half before Liam Trotter equalised with a 92nd-minute penalty as the game finished 1–1. Prior to the game the club announced that Nick Harvey had joined the club as Head of Sports Science, replacing Karl Halabi. At the end of the month Jonathan Henly moved on loan to Aldershot Town until January.

November

The first game in November was an away trip to second from bottom Sheffield Wednesday which ended in a 5–2 defeat. Reading's goals came from Pavel Pogrebnyak and Adam Le Fondre with former player Michail Antonio among the scorers for Wednesday. The team then hosted Queens Park Rangers and took the lead through Garath McCleary though a late Joey Barton free kick leveled the scores as the game finished 1–1. During the international break two players left the club on loan with Gozie Ugwu moving to Shrewsbury Town until early January and Stuart Taylor joining Yeovil Town for a month. Just two days later Taylor's spell was cut short without him having made a competitive appearance due to "personal reasons". Following the international games Reading earned a point away to Blackburn Rovers after a goalless draw. The team then beat Nottingham Forest 3–2 to record their first away win since the victory at Derby in September. Pogrebnyak and Kaspars Gorkšs gave Reading an early 2–0 lead before two ex-Royals, Simon Cox and Darius Henderson drew Forest level. Jordan Obita won the game with his first goal for the club after 74 minutes while Chris Gunter, who was also playing against his former club, was sent off late on for two bookings. Lawson D'Ath joined Dagenham & Redbridge on an emergency loan until the end of December, whilst the local press suggested that Reading had failed in a similar bid for West Bromwich Albion's Graham Dorrans.

December
Reading started the month with a 1–0 home win over Charlton Athletic with Billy Sharp scoring the only goal of the game, his first for the club. Young winger Shepherd Murombedzi joined Bognor Regis Town on a month's loan, whilst Karl Sheppard made his loan move to Shamrock Rovers permanent. The side then faced Bournemouth at the Madejski Stadium, losing 2–1. Having gone two goals down through Lewis Grabban and Matt Ritchie, a late Adam Le Fondre strike proved no more than a consolation. On 10 December, Sean Morrison and Jordan Obita signed new deals which will keep them with the club until summer 2017. A week later Reading travelled to Huddersfield Town and came away with a 1–0 win courtesy of a first half Billy Sharp header. The team then suffered back-to-back losses, going down 2–1 at home to Wigan Athletic and then 1–0 away to automatic promotion contenders Leicester City; Pavel Pogrebnyak scoring Reading's solitary goal. At the end of the month youngsters Matt Partridge and Daniel Lincoln joined Basingstoke Town and Farnborough respectively, while Lawson D'Ath's stay at Dagenham & Redbridge was extended for a further month. Reading ended the year with a third straight defeat after losing heavily away at Middlesbrough. Two goals from Grant Leadbitter and one from Albert Adomah gave the hosts a 3–0 win with the team's disappointment compounded when Kaspars Gorkšs was sent off for two bookable offences.

January

The year began with a 1–1 draw against Nottingham Forest at the Madejski Stadium. The visitors took the lead in the first half when former player Greg Halford headed home before Stephen Kelly equalised in the 5th minute of injury time with his first goal for the club. Following the game, Billy Sharp's loan expired and he returned to Southampton. Despite Reading holding further discussions about his future, no move materialised and he eventually joined former club Doncaster Rovers. The club entered the FA Cup at the third round stage and faced Brighton & Hove Albion at Falmer Stadium. An Andrew Crofts goal in the first half enough to give the hosts a 1–0 and send Reading out of the competition at the first hurdle. Several young players moved to and from the club on loan during the month. Michael Hector returned from Aberdeen after a successful six-month spell and was immediately included in the first team squad while Jonathan Henly joined Oxford United for one month. Dominic Samuel also left the club, joining Lawson D'Ath at Dagenham & Redbridge for a month, though his spell there lasted just one game after he suffered a knee injury requiring surgery 40 minutes into his debut.

A first win for nearly a month came away at Watford with Kaspars Gorkšs getting the only goal. The following week Reading recorded their largest win since 29 December 1979, defeating Bolton Wanderers 7–1 with goals from Gorkšs, Pavel Pogrebnyak, Hope Akpan, Nick Blackman and an Adam Le Fondre hat-trick. The goal was Akpan's first for the club while Michael Hector made also his debut as a late substitute. Seven weeks after his last appearance, Chris Baird's contract expired with the club confirming that they would wait until he was fit again before discussing an extension. Despite netting seven times the previous week, Reading were unable to register a goal in their next match as they lost 2–0 away to Ipswich Town with another former player, Stephen Hunt, among the scorers. Back at home for a midweek game against Blackpool, the side returning to scoring form with a second hat-trick in two home games for Le Fondre helping them to a 5–1 victory. Speculation arose that Reading's lack of activity in the transfer window was due to the ongoing discussions over the ownership of the club, with manager Nigel Adkins appearing to confirm the reports. The window closed at the end of the month with no players having arrived, though Director of Football Nick Hammond confirmed that the club had rejected interest in several of their players. Although there were no permanent transfers completed in either direction, Lawson D'Ath's loan at Dagenham & Redbridge was extended until the end of the season.

February
Reading began the month as they finished the previous, with a comprehensive victory, this time away at Millwall. Goals from Pavel Pogrebnyak, Alex Pearce and Danny Williams secured a 3–0 win. Adam Le Fondre was nominated for January's Championship Player of the Month, and was announced as the winner of the award the following day. The team's next game was a 2–0 defeat at home to Sheffield Wednesday with former Reading loanee Benik Afobe scoring the second for the visitors. The task was made harder when Alex Pearce was sent off after only nine minutes for bringing down Afobe in the penalty area. After the game the club appealed the red card and successfully had it overturned. Reading recovered from the disappointing home defeat to win 3–1 away at promotion rivals Queens Park Rangers. Danny Williams scored his second goal of the month with Alex Pearce and Garath McCleary also on target. Another former player Kevin Doyle, the 2005–06 Reading Player of the Season, had earlier scored the equaliser for QPR. For the second game in a row the team went down to ten men after Kaspars Gorkšs was sent off, though the club were again successful in appealing the decision. Reading's inconsistent form during February continued as they lost their last game of the month 1–0 to Blackburn Rovers. On the loan front, Jonathan Henly's spell at Oxford United was extended for a second month, while fellow goalkeeper Stuart Moore joined Gloucester City until March. After months of speculation and nearly half a year since the full takeover of the club by Anton Zingarevich was due to be completed, Chairman Sir John Madejski confirmed that he was looking for new owners as Zingarevich was no longer involved.

March
 
The first game of the month was a home tie against Yeovil Town which ended 1–1 despite the visitors being reduced to eight men when Byron Webster, Joe Ralls and Kieffer Moore were all sent off in the second half. Having fallen behind to a Shane Duffy header, Reading missed the chance to equalise when Adam Le Fondre's penalty was saved, though from the resulting corner John Lundstram put the ball into his own net. A week later the team came away with the same result at Brighton & Hove Albion with Royston Drenthe scoring Reading's goal, his first for the club. The team then travelled to Leeds United and secured their first win in four games with a 4–2 victory. Goals from Garath McCleary, Nick Blackman, Hal Robson-Kanu and a second in two games for Drenthe gave the side a 4–0 lead and despite the hosts scoring twice in quick succession, Reading held on for the win. A goalless draw against Derby County followed, before a 2–1 away win at Birmingham City with Jobi McAnuff scoring both goals, his first since 17 March 2012. In between the games Jason Roberts confirmed long suspected rumours that he would retire from football after failing to overcome a hip injury suffered against Southampton in December 2012.

Reading's unbeaten record in March came to an end with a disappointing 3–1 home defeat to relegation threatened Barnsley. Pavel Pogrebnyak scored the team's solitary goal from the penalty spot. A home game against Huddersfield Town concluded a busy month of fixtures with a second penalty in as many games from Pogrebnyak earning the side a 1–1 draw. The result extended Reading's winless run at home win to six games, stretching back to the heavy defeat of Blackpool in January. There was further movement among the club's young goalkeepers during the month as Jonathan Henly and Stuart Moore completed spells at Oxford United and Gloucester City respectively. Both then left the club to join Conference South sides on loan until the end of the season with Henly joining Maidenhead United and Moore, Bath City. Reading also confirmed that they had agreed compensation with Watford for former Academy forward Uche Ikpeazu who left in July 2013 after turning down a professional contract.

April
The first game of April was an away trip to Charlton Athletic which Reading won 1–0 thanks to a second half Danny Williams goal. Shortly afterwards the club completed their first signing ahead of the new season, bringing in United States under-18 forward Andrija Novakovich as an Academy player. Reading then took on Bournemouth at Dean Court and suffered a convincing 3–1 defeat. With Danny Williams and Danny Guthrie both injured, four wingers lined up in midfield as the team found themselves 3–0 down at half time. Hal Robson-Kanu scored a consolation for Reading in the second half whilst Wayne Bridge and Mikele Leigertwood, who had been out a year, made their return from injury. Returning to the Madejski Stadium the following week, Reading hosted Leicester City in a game that ended in a 1–1 draw. Alex Pearce scored Reading's goal with an early header, whilst in only his second game back, Leigertwood was sent off for two bookable offences in the dying minutes. Another heavy away defeat followed as the team lost 3–0 to fellow promotion contenders Wigan Athletic, with the result seeing Reading drop out of the play-off places for the first time since March. A 2–0 home win over Middlesbrough ensured a swift return to the top six, whilst a 3–1 win at Doncaster Rovers in the following game saw Reading keep their fate in their own hands going into the last day of the season. Having gone 1–0 down, an Adam Le Fondre penalty and late Pavel Pogrebnyak brace secured the victory.

May

The final game of the season was on 3 May at home to already promoted Burnley. Needing only to equal Brighton & Hove Albion's and Blackburn Rovers' result, Reading took the lead after 16 minutes when Kieran Trippier put the ball in his own net. Two goals in eight minutes gave the visitors a 2–1 lead, and with Brighton drawing at Nottingham Forest, Reading momentarily dropped out of the promotion places. A spectacular Garath McCleary volley, which later won the club's goal of the season award, levelled the match and put them back into the play-off places, but with moments left Brighton scored a winner at Forest leaving Reading just three minutes to score again which, despite late chances, they could not. The results saw Reading finish the season in seventh, one point off Brighton in sixth. Prior to the game Jordan Obita was named the club's Player of the Season in his first year as a regular, with Chris Gunter and Danny Williams coming in second and third respectively.

Three days after the end of the season, five senior players were told that they would not be offered new contracts. Captain Jobi McAnuff, as well as fellow 2011–12 promotion winners Kaspars Gorkšs and Mikele Leigertwood departed after more than 400 combined appearances, along with Stuart Taylor and Wayne Bridge, who subsequently announced his retirement from football. The following week a further five professionals left with Lawson D'Ath the only one among them to have made a first team appearance for the club. The others to leave were Nick Arnold, Shepherd Murombedzi, Matt Partridge and Gozie Ugwu. Jake Taylor and Michael Hector, who both broke into the first team during the season, making nine appearances each, were offered new contracts along with five other young professionals.

Under-21s and Academy 

Prior to the season Reading announced that they had been awarded Category One Academy status under the Elite Player Performance Plan and would therefore continue to compete in Professional Development League 1. The club initially brought in three new scholars: Harry Cardwell, Lewis Collins and Tomas Urbancic, as well as competing the signings of young professionals Samúel Friðjónsson and Aleksandar Gogic whose transfers, along with Urbancic's, were agreed during the previous campaign. Reading later confirmed four further additions, including two youth internationals, along with a number of youngsters promoted from within the club. Uche Ikpeazu, the 2012–13 scholar of the year, departed after rejecting professional terms from the club and joined Watford on a three-year contract.

The under-21s began their season with a 4–2 over Newcastle United at the Madejski Stadium, Gozie Ugwu scoring twice. Despite a successful start, the team won just one of their next seven games, a 3–2 victory against Southampton with Ugwu again scoring twice, and lost the other six, including a 4–0 defeat to Wolverhampton Wanderers. Due to new rules which came into effect for the 2013–14 season, Reading could only play three games at their training ground and therefore chose to play a number of their games at Basingstoke Town's Camrose ground. In November they beat Queens Park Rangers in the first round of the inaugural U21 Premier League Cup, though, after one further league game, a 1–1 draw with Norwich City, they ended 2013 second from bottom of the table. Reading began 2014 in better form, picking up four wins from seven in the league and beating Watford, Wolves and Arsenal in the U21 Cup to advance to the final. The side faced Manchester City in the two-legged final and, despite leading 2–0 after 31 minutes through Uwgu and Craig Tanner, lost the first leg at the City of Manchester Stadium 3–2. The return leg at the Madejski saw over 3,000 watch as the under-21s won the game 2–0, giving them a 4–3 aggregate victory to win the inaugural competition. Despite the cup run, the under-21s finished the season in poor form in the league, winning two and losing four of the seven games following the semi final win at Arsenal. The run saw the team finish 17 out of 22 teams and consigned them to Division Two of the Under-21 Premier League for 2014–15. Craig Tanner finished as the team's top scorer with 13 goals while Ugwu was in second place with 12.

In contrast to the under-21s, the under-18s began the season as they finished the last, winning seven of their first nine games and losing just twice. After a winless November, Reading beat Norwich 3–0 in the league before progressing to the fourth round of the FA Youth Cup with a 3–1 win over Leeds United. The year ended on a bad note after a 6–0 loss to Chelsea, though away from the pitch there was good news with four second year scholars: Dominic Hyam, Liam Kelly, Aaron Kuhl and Jack Stacey, all signing their first professional contracts, tying each of them to the club until summer 2016. In the league, Reading's indifferent form continued throughout January and February with just two wins from seven, though in the Youth Cup, victories over Crewe Alexandra and Accrington Stanley ensured progress into the quarter-finals. The under-18s took on Liverpool at the Madejski Stadium in the last eight and, with the game finishing 4–4 after extra time, required a 5–4 win in the resulting penalty shoot-out to reach the last four of the Youth Cup for the first time in their history. The side faced Fulham in the semi-final with the first leg finishing in a 2–2 draw at the Madejski Stadium. In the return leg at Craven Cottage Reading found themselves leading thanks to goals from Tarique Fosu-Henry and Jack Stacey, though a last minute Moussa Dembélé strike gave Fulham a 3–2 win on the night and a 5–4 aggregate victory. After the cup exit the side won three of their last four games to finish third in the South Group of the Under-18 Premier League. With nine goals each, Harry Cardwell and Liam Kelly were the Academy's joint top scorers. Of the six players whose futures were uncertain upon the conclusion of the season, three: Nana Owusu, George McLennan and Rob Dickie were offered their first professional contracts while the others were released.

Transfers

In

 Bridge's and Williams' transfers were announced on the above dates but were not finalised until 1 July.

Out

Loans in

Loans out

Released

Squad

Left club during season

Competitions

Pre-season friendlies

Championship

League table

Results summary

Matches

League Cup

FA Cup

Squad statistics

Appearances and goals

|-
|colspan="14"|Players who appeared for Reading but left during the season:

|}

Top scorers

Disciplinary record

Awards

Player of the Month

Notes

References 

Reading F.C. seasons
Reading